NGC 5161 is a spiral galaxy in the constellation Centaurus.

See also
 New General Catalogue

References

External links

 detailed information on NGC 5161

Unbarred spiral galaxies
Centaurus (constellation)
5161
47321
UGCA objects